Georgiy Ivanovich Petrov (31 May 1912, Pinega, Arkhangelsk Governorate - 13 May 1987) was a Soviet engineer.
In 1935 after graduating from the Moscow State University, Petrov worked at the Central Aerohydrodynamic Institute. In 1944 he worked at NII-1, a jet propulsion research institute. In 1953 he was nominated professor at the Moscow State University. In the same year he became a member of the USSR Academy of Sciences. From 1965 to 1973 Petrov directed the Russian Space Research Institute.

External links
  Petrov Georgi biography. Encyclopedia Astronautica

1912 births
1987 deaths
People from Pinezhsky District
People from Pinezhsky Uyezd
Soviet engineers
Full Members of the USSR Academy of Sciences